Manuel Schönhuber  (born 25 October 1991) is a German former professional footballer who played as a goalkeeper.

Career
Schönhuber made his professional debut for Wacker Burghausen in the 3. Liga on 29 January 2011, starting in the home match against Wehen Wiesbaden, which finished as a 3–0 away loss.

Personal life
Schönhuber studied in Florida, United States, and became a lawyer in Texas.

References

External links
 
 
 Saint Leo Lions profile

1991 births
Living people
People from Traunstein
Sportspeople from Upper Bavaria
Footballers from Bavaria
German footballers
Association football goalkeepers
SV Wacker Burghausen players
Saint Leo University alumni
3. Liga players
German expatriate footballers
German expatriate sportspeople in the United States
Expatriate soccer players in the United States